MacInnes is a surname. The name is derived from the Gaelic mac Aonghais. Notable people with the surname include:

Alan MacInnes, Canadian judge
Alexander Stewart MacInnes (fl. first half of the 20th century), Scottish clergyman
Angus MacInnes (born 1947), Canadian actor
Campbell MacInnes (1901–1977), Anglican bishop
Catriona MacInnes, Scottish film-maker
Colin MacInnes (1914–1976), English novelist and journalist
Donald MacInnes (1824–1900), Canadian businessman and politician
Duncan MacInnes (1897–1970), Anglican bishop
Duncan Sayre MacInnes (1860–1918), Canadian soldier and engineer
Gordon MacInnes, American politician
Hamish MacInnes (1930–2020), Scottish mountaineer
Helen MacInnes (1907–1985), Scottish-American author
Iain MacInnes, Scottish folk musician
John MacInnes (ice hockey) (1925–1983), Canadian ice hockey player and coach
Maggie MacInnes (born 1963), Scottish folk singer 
Miles MacInnes (1830–1909), British landowner, railway director and Liberal Party politician
Kathleen MacInnes (born 1969), Scottish singer, television presenter and actress
Rennie MacInnes (1870–1931), Anglican bishop
Tom MacInnes (1867–1951), Canadian poet and writer

See also
Clan MacInnes
McInnes
MacInnis

English-language surnames
Scottish surnames